Langsett is a civil parish in the metropolitan borough of Barnsley, South Yorkshire, England.  The parish contains 18 listed buildings that are recorded in the National Heritage List for England.  All the listed buildings are designated at Grade II, the lowest of the three grades, which is applied to "buildings of national importance and special interest".  The parish contains the village of Langsett, and is otherwise almost completely rural.  The listed buildings consist of houses, farmhouses and farm buildings, milestones, a wayside cross, a "take off" stone, and a public house.


Buildings

References

Citations

Sources

 

Lists of listed buildings in South Yorkshire
Buildings and structures in the Metropolitan Borough of Barnsley